Mammitinae comprises a subfamily within the Acanthoceratidae (Ammonoidea) characterized by moderately to very evolute shells with rectangular to squarish whorl sections along with blunt umbilical and prominent inner and outer ventrolateral tubercles on sparse ribs that may be round and strong, sharp and narrow, or absent. The suture is somewhat simpler than that of the Acanthoceratinae. Range is restricted to the lower Turonian stage of the Upper Cretaceous.

Genera include:
Buccinammonites
Buchiceras
Cryptometoicoceras
Dunverganoceras Warren & Stelck, 1940
Mammites Laube & Bruden, 1886
Metasigaloceras Hyatt, 1903
Metoicoceras Hyatt, 1903
Mitonia
Nannometoicoceras
Parabuchiceras
Paracompsoceras
Plesiacanthoceras
Praemetoicoceras
Pseudoaspidoceras Hyatt, 1903
Rhamphidoceras
Spathites
Texacanthoceras

References

 W.J. Arkell, et al., Mesozoic Ammonoidea, Treatise on Invertebrate Paleontology, Part L, Mollusca 4. Geological Society of America and University of Kansas Press.

Acanthoceratidae
Turonian first appearances
Turonian extinctions